Camille Libar (27 December 1917 – 9 October 1991) was a football player and manager from Luxembourg.

Club career
Libar played for Stade Dudelange, RC Strasbourg, FC Girondins de Bordeaux, FC Metz and Toulouse. In the 1948–49 season, he was Ligue 2 top goalscorer with Bordeaux.

International career
He scored 14 goals for Luxembourg from 1938 to 1947. He played in 2 FIFA World Cup qualification matches.

Manager career
He then managed Le Mans and Girondins de Bordeaux.

References

External links
 
 
 
 
 

1917 births
1991 deaths
People from Dudelange
Association football forwards
Luxembourgian footballers
Luxembourg international footballers
Luxembourgian expatriate footballers
RC Strasbourg Alsace players
FC Girondins de Bordeaux players
FC Metz players
Ligue 1 players
Ligue 2 players
Expatriate footballers in France
Expatriate football managers in France
Luxembourgian expatriate sportspeople in France
Luxembourgian football managers
Le Mans FC managers
FC Girondins de Bordeaux managers
Luxembourgian expatriate football managers
Stade Dudelange players